Gary Lynch is a neuroscientist at UC-Irvine. His lab studies memory. He received his PhD from Princeton University in 1968; his PhD advisor was Bryon Campbell. At UCI, his lab began research involving the role of long-term potentiation in memory.  His biography is profiled in the book 101 Theory Drive.

References

Year of birth missing (living people)
Living people
American neuroscientists
University of California, Irvine faculty
Place of birth missing (living people)